Mirzəcəfərli (also, Mirdazhafarli and Mirzadzhafarli) is a village and municipality in the Barda Rayon of Azerbaijan.  It has a population of 546.

References 

Populated places in Barda District